Irvine railway station is a railway station serving the town of Irvine, North Ayrshire, Scotland.

History 
The station opened on 5 August 1839 as part of the Glasgow, Paisley, Kilmarnock and Ayr Railway. During the electrification of the Ayrshire Coast Line by British Rail, Irvine station was partially refurbished, resulting in a glass front canopy on the main building and external ramp access to both platforms.

Facilities 
The station is staffed on a full-time basis seven days a week. There is a small kiosk shop and an adjoining car park with 100 spaces.  Train running information is offered via digital CIS displays, automated announcements, timetable posters and customer help points on each platform. Step-free access is available to both sides of the station.

Services 

References

Notes

Sources 

 
 

Railway stations in North Ayrshire
Former Glasgow and South Western Railway stations
Railway stations in Great Britain opened in 1839
Railway stations served by ScotRail
SPT railway stations
Listed railway stations in Scotland
Category C listed buildings in North Ayrshire
Irvine, North Ayrshire